Dionaea is a genus of flies in the family Tachinidae.

Species
D. aurifrons (Meigen, 1824)
D. breviforceps Emden, 1954
D. flavisquamis Robineau-Desvoidy, 1863
D. magnifrons Herting, 1977

References

Phasiinae
Tachinidae genera
Taxa named by Jean-Baptiste Robineau-Desvoidy